Kwon Yong-jin is a North Korean politician and military officer who currently serves as the director of the General Political Bureau of the Korean People's Army since January 2021.

Biography
Kwon Yong-jin was the director of the General Political Bureau of the Korean People's Army (KPA). He served in this post since he replaced Kim Su-gil in January 2021 until 2022. 
On 24 February 2021 Kwon Yong-jin alongside Minister of People's Armed Forces Kim Jong-Gwan were both promoted to the rank of Vice Marshal.

According to a KCTV video from February 6 2022, Kwon became a General, an apparent demotion from his previous rank as a Vice Marshal.

References

Living people
Year of birth missing (living people)
People from Pyongyang
North Korean military personnel